Conference of Solidarity Support Organizations (CSSO) was an international organization of national groups that supported the trade union Solidarność and human rights in Poland during the final years of the Polish People's Republic. Member organizations agreed to the CSSO Letter of Agreement of January 8/9, 1983 and there were eventually more than twenty international chapters.

History
The CSSO emerged from a series of informal interorganizational meetings throughout 1982 among Solidarity support organizations.  To provide a formal basis for cooperation, and to increase the unity of these support organizations, organizers drafted an agreement. To join the CSSO, organizations had to ratify the CSSO Letter of Agreement.  In it, groups agreed to support and recognize Solidarity in Poland, along with the Coordinating Office Abroad of NSZZ Solidarnosc (based in Brussels, Belgium).  Member organizations still had the freedom to support their own initiatives in Poland and were not required to support the Brussels office, nor proscribe any other links or channels with Solidarity. The CSSO ultimately included 46 organizations in 13 countries.

The CSSO was designed as a forum in which member organizations could exchange ideas and share experiences pertaining to protest activities in Poland. The organization held meetings in which member representatives would consider joint CSSO resolutions and actions.  The CSSO did not control the activities or funds of the member organizations. .

Achievements
The greatest impact of the CSSO was in fostering trust among the leaders of the member organizations.  This did indeed foster collaboration and thus improved the efficacy of numerous initiatives and programs.

Most of the accomplishments came from the member organizations themselves. These accomplishments range from: a massive smuggling of materials to  Solidarity and other groups in Poland; to the above-ground Family-to-Family assistance to the families of the imprisoned and persecuted Solidarity activists; to the Independent Polish Agency news agency providing information and photographs to the news media across the globe; to the professional periodic publications such as Kontakt (Paris), Pogląd and Meinung (West Berlin), Voice of Solidarity (London), ARKA de Informaciones (Mexico City), and Porando-geppo (Tokyo); to political action, lobbying and raising awareness activities in every country; to assistance to the Brussels Coordinating Office and activists in their work on behalf of Solidarity; to sending financial resources to Solidarity and opposition groups in Poland.

The membership of the CSSO organizations consisted primarily of the citizens of the countries where these organizations were located and usually included members who were not of Polish heritage. David Phillips, the first CSSO Secretary, was not of Polish ancestry.  In fact in some organizations, the majority were not of Polish heritage, though sometimes did include non-Poles who were nevertheless fluent in Polish – Yoshiho Umeda (CSSO Asian Coordinator), and Jan Axel Stolz, who served as CSSO Secretary.

CSSO Participating Organizations (1989) 
 Solidarity Victorian Fellowship, Notting Hill Victoria AUSTRALIA
 Action Group in Support of Solidarity, Montreal, Quebec   CANADA
 Friends of Solidarity, Kitchener, Ontario  CANADA
 Friends of Solidarity Edmonton Alberta  CANADA
 Friends of Solidarnosc Association Vancouver British Columbia CANADA
 Group of Solidarity in St. Catharines St. Catharines Ontario  CANADA
 Polish Canadian Action Group Toronto Ontario  CANADA
 Polish Socio-Political Group Independence-Solidarity Calgary  Alberta  CANADA
 Solidarity Support Committee of Toronto Toronto  Ontario  CANADA 
 Solidarnosc Assistance Association Ottawa Ontario  CANADA
 Stowarzyszenie Przyjaciół Solidarności - Winnipeg Winnipeg Manitoba CANADA
 Stot Solidarnosc  Copenhagen DENMARK
 Edition Spotkania Paris  FRANCE
 KONTAKT Vanves  FRANCE
 Radio Solidarnosc Paris  FRANCE
 Solidarite pour Solidarnosc Roubaix FRANCE
 Committee to Support ISTU Solidarity in Japan Tokyo  JAPAN
 Comite de Apoyo a Solidarnosc Mexico DF MEXICO
 Inst. De Estudios de Culture y Sociedades Europeas  Mexico DF MEXICO
 Solidaridad Mexico Mexico DF MEXICO
 Solidarity Organization in New Zealand, Inc. Auckland  NEW ZEALAND
 Solidaritet Norge-Polen  Oslo NORWAY
 Polen-Solidaritetskommittee I Uppsala Uppsala SWEDEN
 Svenska Stodkommitten for Solidaritet  Lund SWEDEN
 Polish Solidarity Campaign  London  UNITED KINGDOM
 Solidarity Action Committee - Manchester Manchester UNITED KINGDOM
 Voice of Solidarity - publishing committee London  UNITED KINGDOM
 Wyre Forest Polish Solidarity Campaign   Kidderminster Worc. UNITED KINGDOM
 Brotherhood of Solidarity Members Chicago IL USA
 Committee in Support of Solidarity Cleveland OH USA
 Committee of Solidarity Members - Former Political Prisoners New York, NY USA
 Friends of Solidarity Families Project Buffalo NY USA
 Friends of Solidarity, Inc Washington DC USA
 Polonia Solidarity Association  Reading PA USA
 Solidarity - California  Los Angeles CA USA
 Solidarity and Human Rights Association Buffalo NY USA
 Solidarity International New York NY USA
 Solidarity International of Connecticut, Inc. New Britain CT USA
 Solidarity Support Committee of Rhode Island Providence RI USA
 Solidarnosc Association   Seattle WA USA
 Support of Solidarity Boston MA USA
 "Solidarnosc" - Venezuela  Caracas  VENEZUELA
Arbeitsgruppe "Solidarnosc" - Eschweiler Achen Eschweiler WEST GERMANY
 Gessellschaft Solidarnosc, e.V.  West Berlin
 Hilfskomitte Solidarnosc  Mainz  WEST GERMANY
 Solidarität der freien Polen in Bayern, e.V. Munich WEST GERMANY

Legacy
Papers and holdings of the CSSO have been preserved in countries where there were active chapters, or an active Polish diaspora population. This also includes Andre Blaszczynski's papers.

References

External links 


Solidarity (Polish trade union)